Women's Murder Club is an American police procedural and legal drama that aired on ABC from October 12, 2007, to May 13, 2008. The series is set in San Francisco, California, and is based on the series of novels by the same name written by James Patterson. Series creators Elizabeth Craft and Sarah Fain also served as executive producers alongside Patterson, Joe Simpson, Brett Ratner, and R. Scott Gemmill. The latter also served as showrunner, with Gretchen J. Berg and Aaron Harberts co-executive producing. The pilot was directed by Scott Winant.

Produced by 20th Century Fox Television, the series first aired on Friday nights at 9:00PM Eastern/8:00PM Central. On October 31, 2007, ABC ordered an additional three scripts.

On March 31, 2008, it was announced that Women's Murder Club would return with three new episodes, beginning on Tuesday April 29, 2008, at 10:00PM Eastern/9:00PM Central, replacing Boston Legal. On May 12, 2008, ABC confirmed that the series would not return for a second season.

Plot
Based on the best-selling series of books by James Patterson and Maxine Paetro, the series revolves around the lives of four women in San Francisco – a homicide detective, an assistant district attorney, a medical examiner, and a newspaper reporter – who come together to use their expertise and talents in their respective fields to solve murder cases. Though they lead distinctly different lives, they are bound together by a strong bond of friendship, which leads the women to realize that pooling their resources during investigations leads to undiscovered clues and answers in both work and their personal lives.

Cast and characters

Main cast
Inspector Lindsay Boxer (Angie Harmon) – Lindsay is the principal character of the series. She is a transplant from her native Texas, as noted by Jacobi in "Play Through the Pain." She has a lingering obsession over the "Kiss-Me-Not" killer, whose case she worked for five years; that obsession led to the breakup of her marriage to Tom Hogan. At the end of the first episode, the "Kiss-Me-Not" killer returns, and though the FBI is now in charge of the case, Lindsay has a hard time letting go. In "FBI Guy", she reveals that her attic is full of information on Kiss-Me-Not's victims and that she considers the destruction of her personal life an acceptable exchange for capturing him. She had a miscarriage while she was married to Tom Hogan ("Maybe, Baby"). After having a one-night stand with Tom prior to his wedding to Heather, she has a pregnancy scare, though it turns out she is actually anemic. She owns a dog, Martha, who she adopted after her original owner was murdered.
Deputy District Attorney Jill Bernhardt (Laura Harris) – Jill is a successful deputy district attorney, who works at City Hall. Her father died when she was eight and she ended up in the foster system some time after her mother remarried ("Blind Dates and Bleeding Hearts"). She has a weak stomach when it comes to gore and vomits often enough at bloody crime scenes that Inspector Boxer usually leaves a barf bag for her. She has a fear of commitment, presumably due to her dislike of her stepfather and her constant shuffling in the foster system.
Dr. Claire Washburn (Paula Newsome) – Claire is a medical examiner for the San Francisco Police Department. She is happily married, but there is some strain due to her husband's recent injury, which has left him needing a wheelchair. She has two sons.
Cindy Thomas (Aubrey Dollar) – Cindy is the youngest member of the Women's Murder Club. She works as a crime reporter for the fictional San Francisco Register, though she previously worked the metro section. Her father, whom she idolized, died eighteen months before the events of "Play Through the Pain." She has an eidetic memory. A running joke through the series is whenever she says or does something that hints at her age, someone, usually Jill Bernhardt, asks if she was 12.
Inspector Warren Jacobi (Tyrees Allen) – Lindsay's loyal partner. He was up for the lieutenant position that went to Tom, but has not expressed much disappointment that he didn't get the job, seeming to prefer field work to the politics of the higher position. He also seems to prefer the finer things in life, having an affinity for wine, 30-year-old whiskey, and opera. He is thrice-divorced and has a child from one of those marriages.
Lieutenant Tom Hogan (Rob Estes) – Lindsay's ex-husband, who in the first episode was promoted to lieutenant and assigned as her boss. He is engaged in the pilot and has remarried by "To Drag and to Hold," but he still worries that Lindsay's obsession with her work will consume her. Tom was played by Christopher Wiehl in the unaired pilot.
Deputy District Attorney Denise Kwon (Linda Park) - Jill's immediate superior at the DA's office, she clashes with her over her "bleeding heart" style. She is also antagonistic towards Jill due to her past romantic history with Hanson North. When the show returned after the writers' strike, the first episode credits no longer showed her name. But by the second episode, she was back in the credits as a series regular.

Recurring cast
Luke Bowen (Coby Ryan McLaughlin) – Jill's ex-boyfriend. He is an ER doctor at the fictional Mission Cross North. Jill and Luke have recently broken up after he finds that she had slept with Hanson.
Hanson North (Kyle Secor) – Defense attorney who has a romantic history with Jill and is currently seeing her boss, Denise Kwon.
Ed Washburn (Jonathan Adams) – Claire's husband. Currently uses a wheelchair full-time after being shot while serving as a police officer.
Heather Hogan née Donnelly (Ever Carradine) – Tom's new wife. She is a kindergarten teacher who is eco-friendly, planning a green wedding.
Pete Raynor (Joel Gretsch) – Lindsay's love interest in season 1, who is in town for only two weeks.

Episodes

The complete series was released on manufactured-on-demand DVD on 29 September 2014.

Reception
After reviewing the pilot and skipping the second advance episode, Tim Goodman, San Francisco Chronicle TV critic, published a highly critical review assigning the paper's lowest possible rating.

New York Times TV critic Alessandra Stanley described many nuanced aspects of the show and concluded with, "Women's Murder Club is all right, but not good enough."

Robert Bianco, USA Today critic, wrote a positive review titled "'Murder Club': A simple pleasure worth living for" and ending with, "Still, the actors are enjoyable, and their series in large part does what it sets out to do. It isn't nearly as good as Friday Night Lights, of course - few shows are.  But unlike so many fall clunkers, it's competent.  This season, that's a rather select club."

Mary McNamara, Los Angeles Times critic, wrote a positive review titled "'Murder Club' is worth joining".

U.S. Nielsen ratings

Season 1: #57, 8.964m

Weekly ratings

International broadcasting
The series airs on and E! in Canada, Network Ten in  Australia and TV3 in New Zealand.
Reruns of the show currently air on Mystery TV in Canada.

In Portugal, the series also airs on Fox Life (first-run) and TVI, but the latter airs the series at prohibitive time slots (around 1 a.m.), causing major criticism. The series is also airs on America Plus which is a part of Orbit Network.

In Hungary, the show aired on June 30, 2008, on RTL Klub.

As of September 5, 2008, WMC also started airing on the Belgian TV channel vtm. The channel officially announced that the show would "strengthen" their Friday Night programming on August 31.

In Latin America, the series is airing on the Fox channel.

In The Netherlands, the show airs on Net 5.

In the Philippines, the series is airing on C/S 9.

The Spanish Fox network also started airing in the beginning of September 2008 under the Spanish name "El Club Contra el Crimen".

The show also airs in South Africa on MNET Series. It premiered on September 11, 2008.

In Russia, the show aired on December 17, 2008, on TV-3.

It has also been aired internationally to the U.S. Military on the American Forces Network (AFN) in 2008.

In Slovakia, the show began airing on January 7, 2009, on TV JOJ.

In France, the first four episodes were aired on March 7, 2009, on M6.

In Singapore, the show aired on November 11, 2009, on MediaCorp Channel 5.

In Italy, the show is airing on La5, but before on Canale 5 in July 2010.

In Germany, the show airs on VOX.

Novels
The following James Patterson Women's Murder Club novels have been released:
 1st to Die  
 2nd Chance  
 3rd Degree 
 4th of July 
 5th Horseman  
 6th Target  
 7th Heaven 
 8th Confession 
 9th Judgement  
 10th Anniversary  
 11th Hour
 12th of Never
 Unlucky 13
 14th Deadly Sin
 15th Affair 
 16th Seduction
 17th Suspect
 18th Abduction 
 19th Christmas
 20th Victim
 21st Birthday
 22 Seconds

Video games
The show generated a series of spin-off games on the PC, Mac and Nintendo DS. For the PC and Mac, four hidden objects games were released: Death in Scarlet (2008), Darker Shade of Grey (2009), Twice in a Blue Moon (2009) and Little Black Lies (2010). Women's Murder Club: Games of Passion was released in 2009.

References

External links
 
 
 

2000s American crime drama television series
2007 American television series debuts
2008 American television series endings
American Broadcasting Company original programming
2000s American legal television series
2000s American mystery television series
English-language television shows
Fictional portrayals of the San Francisco Police Department
Television series by 20th Century Fox Television
Television shows set in San Francisco
American detective television series
Television series about prosecutors